Pallid Peak is a small peak (1,500 m) along the west side of Kosco Glacier, 7 nautical miles (13 km) southwest of McGinnis Peak, in the Queen Maud Mountains. The descriptive name was proposed by Edmund Stump of the United States Antarctic Research Program (USARP) Ohio State University party which geologically mapped the peak on December 3, 1970. Composed entirely of white crystalline marble, the Peak lacks contrast with the snow that skirts it to a high level.

Mountains of the Ross Dependency
Dufek Coast